The Frauen-Bundesliga 2001–02 was the 12th season of the Frauen-Bundesliga, Germany's premier football league. It began on 19 August 2001 and ended on 16 June 2002.

Final standings

Results

Top scorers

References

2001-02
Ger
1
Women